Gulshanoi Satarova (born 1 September 1992) is a Kyrgyz middle-distance runner. She won a silver medal in the 1500 metres at the 2017 Asian Indoor and Martial Arts Games.

Satarova won the Tashkent Marathon in 2022.

International competitions

Personal bests

Outdoor
800 metres – 2:09.36 (Almaty 2014).
1500 metres – 4:22.7 (Bishkek 2015).
5000 metres – 16:56.1 (Bishkek 2014).
Indoor
800 metres – 2:11.58 (Ashgabat 2017).
1500 metres – 4:31.64 (Ashgabat 2017).
3000 metres – 9:34.77 (Hangzhou 2014).

External links

References

1992 births
Living people
Kyrgyzstani female middle-distance runners
Athletes (track and field) at the 2014 Asian Games
Athletes (track and field) at the 2018 Asian Games
Asian Games competitors for Kyrgyzstan
20th-century Kyrgyzstani women
21st-century Kyrgyzstani women